Albert Brown (22 December 1890 – 17 November 1954) was an Australian cricketer. He played six first-class cricket matches for Victoria between 1914 and 1923.

See also
 List of Victoria first-class cricketers

References

External links
 

1890 births
1954 deaths
Australian cricketers
Victoria cricketers
Cricketers from Melbourne